Nactus multicarinatus is a species of lizard in the family Gekkonidae. It is found in the Tuamotu Archipelago, Fiji, Rotuma, Samoa, Solomon Islands, New Caledonia, and Vanuatu.

References

Nactus
Reptiles described in 1872
Taxa named by Albert Günther